The Government Polytechnic Deoria is located in the Deoria district, Uttar Pradesh, India  and is 3.5 km away from the Deoria railway station. The college is situated in approximately 10 acres. It was established in 1983. There are two hostels here and there is also a bicycle stand. It offers a bachelor's degree in engineering in four trades; civil engineering, electrical engineering, electronic engineering, and architectural engineering. The polytechnic also provides training to unemployed villagers and features a library and sports facilities.

Courses
 Civil Engineering
 Electrical Engineering with specialization in Industrial Control
 Electronics Engineering
 Architectural Assistantships

References

External links
 

Education in Deoria, Uttar Pradesh
Technical universities and colleges in Uttar Pradesh
Educational institutions established in 1983
1983 establishments in Uttar Pradesh